Kutravaaligal is a 1985 Indian Tamil-language film directed by Rama Narayanan, starring Raveendran in lead role.

Cast

Raveendran
Viji
Raghuvaran
Jayamalini
Radha Ravi

Soundtrack

References

External links
http://www.valaitamil.com/movies/kutravaaligal_tamil-movies_3108.html

1985 films
1980s Tamil-language films
Films scored by Shankar–Ganesh
Films directed by Rama Narayanan